The 2023 Royal Rumble was the 36th annual Royal Rumble professional wrestling pay-per-view (PPV) and livestreaming event produced by WWE. It was held for wrestlers from the promotion's Raw and SmackDown brand divisions. The event took place on Saturday, January 28, 2023, at the Alamodome in San Antonio, Texas as part of the Alamodome's 30th-anniversary celebration. It was the fourth Royal Rumble event to be held in San Antonio after the 1997, 2007, and 2017 events and the third to take place at the Alamodome, following 1997 and 2017. It was also WWE's first event to be livestreamed on Binge in Australia as the WWE Network service in Australia merged with Binge, a streaming service owned by WWE's Australian rightsholder Foxtel.
 
Traditionally, the Royal Rumble match winner receives a world championship match at that year's WrestleMania. For the 2023 event, only the women's match winner received a choice of which world championship to challenge for at WrestleMania 39. Due to Raw's WWE Championship and SmackDown's Universal Championship being held and defended together as the Undisputed WWE Universal Championship, the men's winner received a match for the tandem titles, while the women had their choice between the Raw or SmackDown Women's Championship. While the Royal Rumble match is typically the main event of the card, this was the seventh Royal Rumble in which the match was not the main event, after 1988, 1996, 1997, 1998, 2006, and 2013. It was also the first Royal Rumble where the eponymous match opened the event.

Five matches were contested at the event. In the main event, Roman Reigns defeated Kevin Owens to retain the Undisputed WWE Universal Championship. For the Royal Rumble matches, Raw's Rhea Ripley won the women's match, becoming the first woman to win the match from the number one spot as well as setting the record for longest time spent in the women's Rumble at 1:01:08 alongside SmackDown's Liv Morgan (who Ripley last eliminated to win the match), while Raw's Cody Rhodes won the men's in the opening match by last eliminating #1 entrant Gunther, who also set the record for longest time spent in a men's 30-man Rumble at 1:11:40 and the second man to draw #1 and emerge as runner-up. In another prominent match, Bray Wyatt, in his first televised match since WrestleMania 37 in April 2021, defeated LA Knight in a Pitch Black match in a cross-promotion with Mountain Dew. The event also saw the return of color commentator, Pat McAfee, who joined Michael Cole and Corey Graves on commentary, Cody Rhodes, Edge, Beth Phoenix, Asuka, Chelsea Green, Nia Jax, and Logan Paul, who made his first Royal Rumble appearance. Former WWE wrestler Michelle McCool also made an appearance in the women's Royal Rumble match, while WWE Hall of Famer and NXT commentator Booker T appeared in the men's.

The event was a financial success and received positive reviews from critics. The men's Royal Rumble match and the climactic end of the event were singled out as highlights of the night.

Production

Background

The Royal Rumble is an annual gimmick event, produced every January by WWE since 1988. It is one of the promotion's five biggest events of the year, along with WrestleMania, SummerSlam, Survivor Series, and Money in the Bank, referred to as the "Big Five". It is named after the Royal Rumble match, a modified battle royal in which the participants enter at timed intervals instead of all beginning in the ring at the same time. Announced on September 7, 2022, the 36th Royal Rumble was scheduled to be held on Saturday, January 28, 2023, at the Alamodome in San Antonio, Texas as part of the Alamodome's 30th-anniversary celebration. It featured wrestlers from the Raw and SmackDown brand divisions. In addition to airing on pay-per-view worldwide, it was available to livestream on Peacock in the United States and the WWE Network in international markets. It was also WWE's first event to air on Binge in Australia after the Australian version of the WWE Network merged under Foxtel's channel Binge on January 23. Tickets went on sale on September 30 with premium hospitality packages also available. The official theme song of the event was "Sold Out" by country music singer Hardy, who performed the song live at the Royal Rumble.

The Royal Rumble match generally features 30 wrestlers and the winner traditionally earns a world championship match at that year's WrestleMania. For 2023, just the women's match winner received a choice of which world championship to challenge for at WrestleMania 39. Due to Raw's WWE Championship and SmackDown's Universal Championship being held and defended together as the Undisputed WWE Universal Championship, the men's winner received a match for the tandem titles, while the women had their choice between the Raw Women's Championship or SmackDown Women's Championship.

Storylines
The event included five matches that resulted from scripted storylines, where wrestlers portrayed heroes, villains, or less distinguishable characters in scripted events that built tension and culminated in a wrestling match or series of matches. Results were predetermined by WWE's writers on the Raw and SmackDown brands, while storylines were produced on WWE's weekly television shows, Monday Night Raw and Friday Night SmackDown.

On December 26, 2022, WWE's YouTube channel promoted a "Pitch Black match" to be held at the Royal Rumble in a cross-promotion with Mountain Dew for the return of the "Pitch Black" flavor. On the December 30 episode of SmackDown, following a couple of months of alleged attacks by Bray Wyatt on LA Knight, with Wyatt claiming it was someone named Uncle Howdy, Knight challenged Wyatt to a match at the Royal Rumble, and Wyatt accepted. Howdy then appeared and attacked Wyatt. It was later confirmed that this would be the Pitch Black match. This would also notably be Wyatt's first televised match since WrestleMania 37 in April 2021. During an appearance on the WWE After The Bell podcast on January 4, 2023, Knight said the only thing he knew about the match was that it would essentially be a street fight "kind of in the dark". On the January 6 episode of SmackDown, commentator Michael Cole further stated that the match would be anything goes that ends via pinfall or submission, but nothing else was known.

At Survivor Series WarGames, Kevin Owens, who had past issues with Roman Reigns, was one of the members of the opposing team in a WarGames match against Reigns' team, The Bloodline. The two previously feuded over the Universal Championship only for Owens to constantly lose due to interference from members of The Bloodline, including their manager Paul Heyman—Owens and Reigns' last title match was at the 2021 Royal Rumble. The Bloodline was victorious at Survivor Series thanks to Sami Zayn—Owens' former best friend—betraying Owens to show his loyalty to The Bloodline. Despite the loss, Owens continued to target The Bloodline over the next few weeks and Owens teamed with a returning John Cena to defeat Reigns and Zayn on the December 30, 2022, episode of SmackDown, where Owens pinned Zayn. The following week, Owens challenged Reigns for the Undisputed WWE Universal Championship at the Royal Rumble, which was made official. 

On the December 12, 2022, episode of Raw, Alexa Bliss defeated Bayley to become the number one contender for the Raw Women's Championship. After the match, champion Bianca Belair congratulated Bliss and as the two hugged, Bray Wyatt's logo appeared on the TitanTron (due to Bliss' past association with Wyatt) and Bliss positioned Belair for a Sister Abigail but came back to her senses before performing the move. The following week, Belair and Bliss were interviewed backstage, where at the end of the segment, Wyatt's logo again appeared on the screen and Bliss hit Belair over the head with a vase of flowers. During her championship match against Belair on January 2, 2023, episode, Bliss was distracted by people wearing Uncle Howdy masks, and after Wyatt's logo appeared on the TitanTron, Bliss attacked the referee, forcing a disqualification and allowing Belair to retain. After the match, Bliss attacked Belair, performing two DDTs on the steel stairs.  On the January 16 episode, Belair challenged Bliss to a championship rematch at the Royal Rumble, and Bliss accepted. The two then brawled with Bliss getting the upper hand after an appearance by Howdy.

On the January 16 episode of Raw, after weeks of footage showing Cody Rhodes' journey to recovery from a torn pec he suffered before Hell in a Cell in June 2022, Rhodes announced that he would be returning from his injury as an entrant in the men's Royal Rumble match.

Event

Preliminary matches
The pay-per-view opened with the men's Royal Rumble match for a men's world championship match at WrestleMania 39: notably, this was the first time the eponymous match began the event. Gunther and Sheamus began the match. The Miz entered at #3 and tried distracting Sheamus to allow Gunther to eliminate him, however,  Sheamus fought off Gunther and Miz. Sheamus chased Miz around the ring, however, Gunther subdued Miz. With the assistance of Johnny Gargano (#5), Sheamus performed 10 Beats of the Bodhran on Miz. Gargano then performed a superkick on Miz, followed by Sheamus performing a Brogue Kick on Miz to eliminate him. Kofi Kingston (#4) and Xavier Woods (#6) doubled teamed the other competitors in the match, after which, Woods teased taking on Kingston only to play to the crowd instead. Drew McIntyre (#9) dominated the other competitors and performed a Claymore Kick on Karrion Kross (#7) to eliminate him. After Gunther eliminated Woods, Gunther sent Kingston over the top ring rope and knocked him off onto an commentator chair at ringside, thus Kingston was eliminated. Brock Lesnar entered at #12 and performed German suplexes on McIntyre, Sheamus and Dawkins. Lesnar then eliminated Santos Escobar (#10), Angelo Dawkins (#11), and Chad Gable (#8). As Lesnar and Gunther stared each other down, Bobby Lashley entered at #13, performed a spear on Lesnar, McIntyre and Sheamus, and a powerslam on Gargano and Gunther. Lesnar attempted an F-5 on Lashley, only for Lashley to eliminate him. An enraged Lesnar threw the announce table cover into the ring and threw a tantrum at ringside, after which, he attacked #14 entrant Baron Corbin with an F-5 during Corbin's entrance. Lesnar then tossed a referee over the ring barricade before leaving the ring. As Corbin did not officially enter the match due to getting attacked by Lesnar earlier, #15 entrant Seth "Freakin" Rollins threw Corbin into the ring, performed a superkick on Corbin and eliminated him. #16 entrant Otis dominated everyone else. Rey Mysterio was supposed to enter at #17, however, he did not come out due to a presumed attack by his son, Dominik Mysterio, who entered at #18 while wearing Rey's mask. During Dominik's entrance, Sheamus eliminated Otis. Instead of entering the ring, Dominik showboated at ringside while Sheamus tried to taunt him. Dominik eventually entered the match and tried to eliminate Sheamus, however, Sheamus countered. Elias entered at 19th, wielding a guitar, and smashed it over Gunther's back. McIntyre and Sheamus performed a Claymore Kick and Brogue Kick simultaneously on Elias, after which, both eliminated Elias. Finn Bálor entered at #20 and teamed up with his fellow Judgment Day teammate, Dominik, to eliminate Gargano. NXT commentator and WWE Hall of Famer Booker T entered at #21 as a surprise entrant and attacked Bàlor and Dominik, after which, he performed the Spin-a-roonie to appease the crowd, however, he was quickly eliminated by Gunther. The last member of Judgement Day, Damian Priest, entered at #22, and the stable then proceeded to dominate the other competitors. Priest eliminated Montez Ford, who entered at #23. Edge, in his first appearance since losing to Bálor at the 2022 Extreme Rules, entered #24 and performed Spears on Bálor, Priest and Dominik. Edge eliminated Bálor and Priest. As Edge attempted to eliminate Dominik, Priest and Bálor eliminated Edge from the outside, after which, a brawl ensued between Edge and Bálor & Priest at ringside. The brawl spilled to the entrance aisle until Rhea Ripley came out and attacked Edge. Edge's wife, Beth Phoenix, then appeared and performed a Spear on Ripley. Omos entered #26 and dominated the other competitors. Braun Strowman entered at #27 and a brawl ensued between Strowman and Omos, after which, Strowman eliminated Omos. Both McIntyre and Sheamus then performed the 10 Beats of the Bodhran on Strowman, however, Gunther then eliminated both McIntyre and Sheamus. Logan Paul, in his first appearance since Crown Jewel in November 2022, entered at #29, however, he was quickly outnumbered by the other competitors. The last entrant, Cody Rhodes, then entered the match. Rhodes countered Dominik's Three Amigos and performed Cross Rhodes on Dominik before eliminating him from the match. Gunther performed the Last Symphony on Strowman. Ricochet (#28) and Paul leapt off the top rope and collided with each other. Rhodes eliminated Strowman, after which, Ricochet fought Rhodes off, only to be eliminated by Austin Theory (#25). Shortly afterwards, Gunther broke Rey Mysterio's record for the longest time spent in a traditional Royal Rumble match. Rollins performed a Stomp on Theory followed by Rhodes eliminating Theory. The final four were Rhodes, Gunther, Rollins, and Paul. Rhodes and Rollins both performed Pedigrees on Gunther. After Paul eliminated Rollins, Rhodes performed Cross Rhodes on Paul and eliminated him. In the closing moments, after a long battle between Gunther and Rhodes, Rhodes performed Cross Rhodes on Gunther and performed a clothesline on Gunther out of the ring to win the match and earn himself an Undisputed WWE Universal Championship match at WrestleMania 39. Rhodes became the fifth person to win the match from the #30 position. Additionally, Gunther set a new record for longest time spent in a men's Royal Rumble match at 1:11:40 and the second #1 entrant after "Stone Cold" Steve Austin in 1999 to emerge as runner-up.

Next, LA Knight faced Bray Wyatt in the Mountain Dew Pitch Black match. This was an anything goes match done under blacklighting. The blacklighting illuminated body and face paint on Wyatt which presented Wyatt with a demon-like appearance, including red eyes. During the match, Knight leapt off the barricade and performed a splash on Wyatt through the announce table. Wyatt then threw a toolbox into the ring, however, Knight attacked Wyatt. In the end, Knight attacked Wyatt with a kendo stick from the top turnbuckle and then attempted to attack Wyatt again, however, Wyatt performed Sister Abigail on Knight to win the match. After the match, Wyatt put on a demon-esque mask and taunted Knight. Knight escaped and attacked Wyatt with a kendo stick who stalked Knight into the crowd. Wyatt performed the Mandible Claw on Knight atop a raised platform—reminiscent of Wyatt's former Fiend gimmick. Uncle Howdy then appeared and performed an elbow drop off a raised platform onto Knight, which set off a pyro explosion, and the Firefly Fun House characters were seen watching from the raised platform.

After that, Bianca Belair defended the Raw Women's Championship against Alexa Bliss. In the end, as Bliss attempted Sister Abigail on Belair, Belair countered and performed a Kiss of Death on Bliss to retain the title. After the match, a video package aired with old clips of Bliss from when she was associated with Bray Wyatt, and Uncle Howdy then asked Bliss if she was truly in control of herself.

The penultimate match was the women's Royal Rumble match for a women's championship match at WrestleMania 39. Rhea Ripley (#1) and Liv Morgan (#2) began the match. Emma, in her first Royal Rumble match, entered at #4 and began to target Ripley. Dana Brooke (#3), Emma, and Morgan tried to eliminate Ripley, however, Ripley fought them off. Bayley then entered the match as entrant #6, followed by Hit Row's B-Fab, who entered at #7. B-Fab would then be quickly eliminated by Ripley. NXT Women's Champion Roxanne Perez was a surprise entrant at #8 and dominated the other competitors. Bayley's Damage CTRL teammates, Dakota Kai (#9) and Iyo Sky (#10), entered the match and all three members of Damage CTRL teamed up to eliminate Brooke. Bayley eliminated Emma followed by Damage CTRL eliminating Perez. A returning Natalya entered at #11, and after a brief partnership with her former tag team partner, Shayna Baszler (#5), Natalya turned on Baszler and both started attacking each other. As Natalya and Baszler tried to eliminate each other, Bayley, Kai and Sky eventually eliminated both. NXT's Zoey Stark entered at #13. Sky shoved Candice LeRae (#12) off a turnbuckle to eliminate her. Becky Lynch entered at #15 and began to target Damage CTRL, however, Bayley threw Lynch through the second rope and Kai and Sky brawled with Lynch at ringside, eventually sending her over the announce table. Tegan Nox entered at #16 and dominated Damage CTRL who reentered the ring as they were not eliminated after brawling with Lynch earlier. Asuka entered at #17 and began to target Bayley. Asuka then eliminated Nox. Tamina entered at #19 and had a stare down with Piper Niven (previously known as Doudrop, and reverting to the name she used in NXT UK), who entered at #18. After Tamina took out Niven, Bayley, Kai and Sky dominated Tamina, however, Lynch returned to the match and targeted Bayley, Kai and Sky. A returning Chelsea Green entered at #20 only for Ripley to eliminate her in five seconds, setting the record for shortest time spent in a women's Royal Rumble. After Lynch eliminated Kai and Sky, Bayley eliminated Lynch, however, Bayley was eliminated by Morgan. A second brawled ensued between Lynch and Damage CTRL  brawled with Damage CTRL, which spilled into the crowd. Zelina Vega entered at #21, donning cosplay in a cross-promotion with Street Fighter and fought with Xia Li (#14) on the ring apron, eventually eliminating Li. Raquel Rodriguez entered at #22 and dominated the other competitors. Lacey Evans entered at #24, followed by Michelle McCool entering at #25, who was seated in the front row. After McCool eliminated Tamina, NXT's Indi Hartwell entered at #26, making a surprise appearance. Sonya Deville entered at #27, after which, Deville eliminated Stark. Evans applied a Cobra Clutch on Vega before eliminating her. Shotzi, who recovered from a hand injury in December, entered at #28. As Hartwell attempted a springboard, Deville eliminated her. Nikki Cross entered at #29 and dominated the other competitors. Nia Jax, in her first WWE appearance since her release in November 2021, entered at #30. Ripley performed a Riptide on Jax, after which, all the other wrestlers ganged up on Jax and eliminated her. Rodriguez eliminated Evans and Asuka eliminated Deville. Ripley eliminated McCool, and Yim performed Eat Defeat on Shotzi to eliminate her, after which, Ripley threw Yim at Shotzi to eliminate her. After a battle between Rodriguez and Niven, Rodriguez eliminated Niven. As Rodriguez attempted a Texana Bomb on Ripley, Ripley pulled her over the top rope and eliminated her. The final four were Ripley, Morgan, Cross, and Asuka. Asuka quickly eliminated Cross, and in the closing moments, Asuka spat mist on Morgan, which gave Ripley the chance to eliminate Asuka. Morgan performed a Codebreaker on Ripley, who prevented elimination. Ripley then headscissored Morgan to the floor to win the match and earn herself a women's championship match at WrestleMania 39. This win made Ripley the first woman to win the women's Royal Rumble match from the number one position (and the fourth person overall to do so), and saw her and Morgan spend the longest time in a women's Rumble match at 1:01:08, beating Bianca Belair's previous record of 57 minutes and 10 seconds. Additionally, this was only the fourth time that the first and second entrants lasted the entire match and finished as the final two (last occurring in 1995, 1999, and 2021).

Following this, country music singer Hardy performed his song "Sold Out".

Main event
In the main event, Roman Reigns (accompanied by Paul Heyman and Sami Zayn) defended the Undisputed WWE Universal Championship against Kevin Owens. During the match, Owens performed a Frog Splash on Reigns for a nearfall. Reigns performed a powerbomb on Owens for a nearfall. Reigns performed a Superman Punch on Owens for a nearfall. As reigns attempted a spear on Owens, Owens sent Reigns into the ring post and Owens performed a Senton on Reigns for a nearfall. Reigns performed a Spear on Owens for a nearfall. As Reigns attempted another Spear, Owens countered with an attempted stunner, however, Reigns countered and shoved Owens into the referee, incapacitating him. Owens then performed a pop-up powerbomb on Reigns, however, the referee was unable to count the pin. Reigns then performed a low blow on Owens and then instructed Zayn to retrieve a chair. As Reigns was momentarily distracted by Zayn who hesitated in handing the chair to Reigns, Owens performed a Stunner on Reigns for a nearfall. As Owens went for another pop-up powerbomb, Reigns intercepted Owens with a Superman Punch and a second Spear for a nearfall. At ringside, Zayn distracted Owens imploring him to stay down. Reigns then took advantage and performed a Spear on Owens through the barricade. Reigns then slammed Owens' head against the steel steps twice. In the end, Owens slapped Reigns, who responded with a third Spear on Owens to retain the titles.

After the match, the rest of The Bloodline (Jey Uso, Jimmy Uso, and Solo Sikoa) came out. As Jey attempted to adorn Zayn with the tribal garland, Reigns intervened and the Bloodline then delivered a beatdown to Owens, with The Usos and Sikoa doing the damage while Zayn was watching. Heyman handed two pairs of handcuffs to Reigns and The Usos  handcuffed both arms of Owens to the ropes. After The Usos viciously attacked Owens with superkicks, Reigns attempted to strike a fallen Owens with a chair, however, Zayn intervened and told Reigns that Owens had enough and such a savage attack was beneath someone of Reigns' status. Reigns then handed the chair to Zayn, instructing him to strike Owens to prove his loyalty to The Bloodline. Zayn hesitated, and Reigns then began berating Zayn, pointing out how much Reigns and The Bloodline had done for Zayn in elevating his career. A conflicted Zayn then attacked Reigns with the chair, which prompted the entire Bloodline (except Jey, who had taken a liking to Zayn and was emotionally conflicted by what he just witnessed) to beat down Zayn. Jey left the ring and Zayn was removed from the Bloodline, turning Zayn face in the process. Reigns, Jimmy, Sikoa, and Heyman headed up the entrance aisle while Owens and Zayn were laid out in the ring as the event came to an end.

Reception 
The 2023 Royal Rumble was a financial success for WWE. The company reported that it was the biggest gate in Royal Rumble history, garnering more than US$7.7 million, more than 50% than the previous record set by the 2017 event. It also had a 52% increase in viewership over the previous record set by the 2022 event. Additionally, the 2023 event broke all-time venue merchandise and sponsorship records, with merchandise sales up 135% over the record set in 2022, and sponsorship revenue was up nearly 200% over 2022. Sponsorships included Mountain Dew for the Pitch Black match and Applebee's for the countdown clock. The final segment featuring The Bloodline, particularly between Roman Reigns and Sami Zayn, generated over 20 million views across all of WWE's social media platforms. Dave Meltzer reported the Mountain Dew sponsorship was for 1 million dollars.

WWE reported an attendance of 51,338, though a report by Fightful said that the WWE sold 44,569 tickets for the event. The number of tickets scanned and entered was 42,928.

Dave Meltzer gave star ratings for each match of the night. The lowest rated match was Bray Wyatt vs LA Knight which received 0.75 stars, Bianca Belair vs Alexa Bliss received 1.5 stars, both Kevin Owens vs Roman Reigns and The Women's Royal Rumble Match received 3.5 stars, and the men's Royal Rumble received 4.5 Stars, the highest rated match of the night.

Aftermath

Raw
Men's Royal Rumble match winner Cody Rhodes opened the following episode of Raw, setting his sights on Roman Reigns and the Undisputed WWE Universal Championship at WrestleMania 39. Afterwards, he was interrupted by The Judgment Day (Damian Priest, Dominik Mysterio, and Finn Bálor). After they mocked Rhodes' Rumble win, Edge appeared and attacked The Judgment Day. A match between Bálor and Rhodes was later scheduled for that episode's main event. During the match, The Judgment Day tried to help Bálor win, but Edge evened the odds, only to be attacked by Rhea Ripley. However, Beth Phoenix took care of Ripley, allowing Rhodes to win the match. The following week, Edge and Phoenix challenged Bálor and Ripley to a mixed tag team match at Elimination Chamber, which Bálor accepted.

Also on Raw, women's Royal Rumble match winner Rhea Ripley announced that she would challenge Charlotte Flair for the SmackDown Women's Championship at WrestleMania 39. This in turn left the Raw Women's Champion without a WrestleMania opponent. As such, WWE official Adam Pearce announced that at Elimination Chamber, there would be an Elimination Chamber match with three wrestlers from Raw and SmackDown each with the winner earning a Raw Women's Championship match at WrestleMania 39. The four Royal Rumble runner ups were automatically added to the match: Asuka and Nikki Cross from Raw and Raquel Rodriguez and Liv Morgan from SmackDown. Asuka won the match to become the number one contender for the title at WrestleMania 39.

Bayley talked about eliminating Becky Lynch in the women's Royal Rumble match, only for Lynch to interrupt. After the two talked about their history, Lynch challenged Bayley to a Steel Cage match for the following week, but Bayley rejected. However, when Lynch brought Dakota Kai, whose ankle was wrapped around a chair, to the stage and threatened to stomp on the chair, Bayley accepted the challenge. During the match, Bayley was about to win after interference from Damage CTRL (Kai and Iyo Sky), but a returning Lita took out Kai and Sky, and helped Lynch defeat Bayley. Two weeks later, Lita and Lynch challenged Kai and Sky for the WWE Women's Tag Team Championship and defeated them on the February 27 episode to win the titles thanks to a returning Trish Stratus taking out Bayley, who tried interfering. The following week, Stratus, who had retired at SummerSlam in 2019, said she was coming out of retirement so that she, Lynch, and Lita could challenge Damage CTRL to a six-woman tag team match at WrestleMania 39, and Damage CTRL accepted.

On the February 6 episode of Raw, Brock Lesnar appeared with a match contract and challenged Bobby Lashley to another match at Elimination Chamber. Lashley came out and said he would give him an answer later on after reviewing the contract. Lesnar then attacked Lashley with two F-5s. An official contract signing for a match at Elimination Chamber took place the following week, and after Lashley laid out Lesnar, he signed the contract to make the match official.

After the Royal Rumble, Seth "Freakin" Rollins began bad mouthing Logan Paul in interviews, stating that he did not want Paul to be in wrestling. At Elimination Chamber during the titular match, Paul snuck into the chamber and attacked Rollins, costing him the United States Championship. During the February 27 episode of Raw, Rollins called out Paul to meet him face-to-face on the following episode, and Paul accepted. There, Rollins wanted to fight, but Paul said he would not fight for free and hinted that they could fight at WrestleMania 39. WrestleMania host The Miz said he could make the match official, and it was later confirmed.

SmackDown
On the following episode of SmackDown, Undisputed WWE Universal Champion Roman Reigns (with Paul Heyman) talked about Sami Zayn's contributions to The Bloodline, but thought he saw greed in Zayn. Reigns then stated that Zayn used his island of relevancy. Afterwards, Zayn attacked Reigns from behind, and performed his own Spear on Reigns, only for Reigns to retreat. Zayn then challenged Reigns for the Undisputed WWE Universal Championship, but was attacked by Jimmy Uso and Solo Sikoa (Jey Uso was absent for the episode). Reigns prevented Sikoa from doing further damage to Zayn, and accepted Zayn's challenge, stating that since Zayn hurt his family, he would hurt Zayn in front of his own family in Montreal at Elimination Chamber. After Reigns retained against Zayn, Kevin Owens prevented The Bloodline (minus Jey) from doing further damage to Zayn.

Results

Men's Royal Rumble match entrances and eliminations
 – Raw
 – SmackDown
 – NXT
 – Unaffiliated
 – Winner
(HOF) – WWE Hall of Famer

Women's Royal Rumble match entrances and eliminations
 – Raw
 – SmackDown
 – NXT
 – Unaffiliated
 – Winner

References

External links
 

2023 in Texas
2023 WWE Network events
2023 WWE pay-per-view events
Events in San Antonio
January 2023 events in the United States
Professional wrestling in San Antonio
Royal Rumble